Sangok station is a railway station on Seoul Subway Line 7.

Station layout

Seoul Subway Line 7

References

Seoul Metropolitan Subway stations
Metro stations in Incheon
Bupyeong District
Railway stations in South Korea opened in 2021